USB drive may refer to:

 A USB flash drive or "thumb drive", a USB-connected computer storage using semiconductor non-volatile random-access memory
 A USB external drive, a hard drive fitted with a USB interface
 Secure Digital, a non-volatile memory card format
 CompactFlash, a flash memory mass storage device
 Memory Stick, a removable flash memory card format